Drobočnik is a settlement on the left bank of the Soča River south of Most na Soči in the Littoral region of Slovenia.

References

External links
Drobočnik on Geopedia

Populated places in the Municipality of Tolmin